Jemníky is a municipality and village in Kladno District in the Central Bohemian Region of the Czech Republic. It has about 300 inhabitants.

Notable people
Georg Druschetzky (1745–1819), composer and musician

References

Villages in Kladno District